Hamilton West is a New Zealand parliamentary electorate. It has been held by Tama Potaka MP of the National Party since the 2022 by-election.

Hamilton West is regarded as a bellwether seat. In 17 of the 18 general elections since the electorate's creation, the party that has won the plurality of seats nationally has won Hamilton West. The sole exception was in 1993, when Labour won the electorate but National won the plurality of the seats.

Population centres
Through an amendment in the Electoral Act in 1965, the number of electorates in the South Island was fixed at 25, an increase of one since the 1962 electoral redistribution. It was accepted that through the more rapid population growth in the North Island, the number of its electorates would continue to increase, and to keep proportionality, three new electorates were allowed for in the 1967 electoral redistribution for the next election. In the North Island, five electorates were newly created (including Hamilton West) and one electorate was reconstituted while three electorates were abolished (including ). In the South Island, three electorates were newly created and one electorate was reconstituted while three electorates were abolished. The overall effect of the required changes was highly disruptive to existing electorates, with all but three electorates having their boundaries altered.

The former Hamilton electorate had existed since  and had covered the urban area. When it was replaced by Hamilton West for the 1969 election, only part of the urban area was included but also rural land stretching all the way to the west coast. Most of the rural land had previously been part of the  electorate. The town of Raglan was the north-western point of the electorate, and was surprisingly not located in the  electorate. In the south-west, the electorate stretched as far as just north of the Kāwhia Harbour.

The 1972 electoral redistribution significantly reduced the size of the Hamilton West electorate, and all the rural land mostly transferred to the Raglan electorate. The additional electorate of Hamilton East was created at the same time. The Waikato River divides the city in half and forms the boundary between the Hamilton East and Hamilton West electorates.

History
The first representative of Hamilton West was Leslie Munro of the National Party, who had since the  represented the Waipa electorate. When Hamilton West became an urban electorate in 1972, Munro retired and the electorate was won by Dorothy Jelicich of the Labour Party.

Members of Parliament
Unless otherwise stated, all MPs terms began and started at general elections.

Key

List MPs
Members of Parliament elected from party lists in elections where that person also unsuccessfully contested the Hamilton West electorate. Unless otherwise stated, all MPs terms began and ended at general elections.

Election results

2022 by-election

2020 election

2017 election

2014 election

2011 election

Electorate (as at 26 November 2011): 44,793

2008 election

2005 election

2002 election

1999 election

1996 election

1993 election

1990 election

1987 election

1984 election

1981 election

1978 election

1975 election

1972 election

1969 election

Table footnotes

Notes

References

External links
Electorate Profile Parliamentary Library

New Zealand electorates
Politics of Hamilton, New Zealand
1969 establishments in New Zealand